Ereğli Belediyesi Spor Kulübü is the women's volleyball club based in Konya, Turkey.

Current squad

See also
 See also Turkey women's national volleyball team

References

External links
 Turkish Volleyball Federation 

Women's volleyball teams in Turkey
Sport in Konya